Deh Sheykh or Deh-e Sheykh or Deh Shaikh or Deh Sheikh or Deh-i-Shaikh or Dehsheykh may refer to:
 Deh Sheykh, Lamerd, Fars Province
 Deh Sheykh, Shiraz, Fars Province
 Deh-e Sheykh, Arzuiyeh, Kerman Province
 Deh-e Sheykh, alternate name of Deh-e Sheykh Soltan Abdollah, Jiroft County, Kerman Province
 Dehsheykh, alternate name of Deh Sheykh Morghazi, Jiroft County, Kerman Province
 Deh-e Sheykh 2, Kerman Province
 Deh Sheykh, Sirjan, Kerman Province
 Deh-e Sheykh, Mohammadabad, Zarand County, Kerman Province
 Deh-e Sheykh, Sarbanan, Zarand County, Kerman Province
 Deh-e Sheykh, Sonqor, Kermanshah Province
 Deh-e Sheykh, Khuzestan
 Deh-e Sheykh Dilgun, Kohgiluyeh and Boyer-Ahmad Province
 Deh Sheykh-e Pataveh, Kohgiluyeh and Boyer-Ahmad Province
 Deh Sheykh-e Tasuj, Kohgiluyeh and Boyer-Ahmad Province
 Deh Sheykh, Razavi Khorasan
 Deh Sheykh, South Khorasan